Third-seeded Rod Laver defeated Neale Fraser 5–7, 3–6, 6–3, 8–6, 8–6 in the final to win the men's singles tennis title at the 1960 Australian Championships.

Seeds
The seeded players are listed below. Rod Laver is the champion; others show the round in which they were eliminated.

 Neale Fraser (finalist)
 Roy Emerson (semifinals)
 Rod Laver (champion)
 Bob Mark (quarterfinals)
 Martin Mulligan (quarterfinals)
 Bob Hewitt (semifinals)
 Bob Howe (second round)
 Trevor Fancutt (second round)

Draw

Key
 Q = Qualifier
 WC = Wild card
 LL = Lucky loser
 r = Retired

Finals

Earlier rounds

Section 1

Section 2

External links
 

1960 in Australian tennis
1960